Marcus Keith Gibson (born 15 November 1973) is an Australian writer who emerged at a young age with the novel D.

Early life

Gibson was born into a devout Christian family in Sydney. He was raised in a strict environment, and by 16 was teaching in a Sunday School run by his parents. At 17, Gibson dropped out of high school to attend Baptist Bible College, but returned to complete high school after one year of study.

Works

Gibson's first novel, D, was acquired by HarperCollins in Sydney in 1994, and released the following December. The literary thriller sold its 10,000 copy print run in little over a month.

Awards and recognition

Prior to the publication of his first novel, Gibson won recognition in short story awards and anthologies including Paradise To Paranoia published by University of Queensland Press, Suncorp Literary Awards and commemorative anthology, Young Writer of the Year, and Nescafe Big Break, 1994.

Gibson's novel received favorable reviews in numerous periodicals ('Aurealis', 'Australian Newsagent & Stationer', 'The Southern Star (Brisbane)') and became a popular item in public libraries through the Australian government's Public Lending Right Scheme.

Gibson made several media appearances, including national television ('Good Morning Australia'), appeared in TV commercials ('Nescafe' TVC w/ Russell Crowe), national radio (ABC national radio), print (The Sydney Morning Herald 23 December 1995, The Australian, Telegraph Mirror, 16 December 1995), voice-over for pre-recorded radio and other TVCs, and live appearances as a guest on late night television (‘Ground Zero’, Network 10).

Gibson is a member of the high IQ society Mensa International.

Later career

In 1996 Marcus attended the Australian Film Television and Radio School; and served on the judging panel for the AFTRS Cinematography award.

That same year, he attempted to launch an electronic media publishing venture, applying for a world trademark and patent for an 'e-book' device, but the applications lapsed.

In the following years, Gibson worked as a script editor, and freelance writer while seeking a publisher for The Atheists' Bible. Drafts of the manuscript, circulated in 2001, discussed acts of terrorism attributed to Osama bin Laden. Gibson withdrew the novel from sale after the World Trade Center attacks on 11 September 2001. In 2006 Gibson released a sample of The Atheists' Bible on his website, www.theatheistsbible.com. This website is no longer active.

In 2009 Gibson completed his third manuscript, titled The Peace Bomb. The manuscript predicted a nuclear incident in the Mantapsan Mountains in North Korea, the continuation of Iranian President Mahmoud Ahmadinejad's leadership, and a call by the US government for a new nuclear non-proliferation treaty. Within weeks of the submission of the manuscript to publishers, all three predictions took place.

In September 2010, a link to a YouTube video was posted on Facebook, showing a teaser/trailer for a novel by Marcus Gibson titled The Dead See. The featured work appears to be similar to The Atheists' Bible. In September 2011 'The Dead See' became available on Amazon and various e-book platforms. The Facebook page for this work has since gathered more than 10,000 fans.

Gibson now resides in Melbourne and works in environmental management.

References

1973 births
Living people
20th-century Australian novelists
20th-century Australian male writers
21st-century Australian novelists
Australian male novelists
Australian male short story writers
Mensans
20th-century Australian short story writers
21st-century Australian short story writers
21st-century Australian male writers